The Indices of deprivation 2007 (ID 2007) is a deprivation index at the small area level, created by the British Department for Communities and Local Government (DCLG) and released on 12 June 2007. It follows the Indices of deprivation 2004 (ID2004) and because much of the datasets are the same or similar between indices, it allows for a comparison of 'relative deprivation' of an area between the two indices.
Deprivation Index=H-Value/H-L

While it is known as the ID2007, most of the data actually dates from 2005, and most of the data for the ID2004 was from 2001.

Like the ID2004 it is unusual in that it includes a measure of geographical access as an element of deprivation and its direct measure of poverty (through data on benefit receipts). The ID 2007 is based on the idea of distinct dimensions of deprivation which can be recognised and measured separately. These are then combined into a single overall measure. The Index is made up of seven distinct dimensions of deprivation called Domain Indices.

Income
Employment
Health and disability
Education, skills and training
Barriers to Housing and Services
Living environment
Crime

Further details can be found at the ID2004 entry.

Geography

Like the ID2004, the ID2007 are measured at Lower Layer Super Output Areas and have similar strengths and weakness regarding concentrated pockets of deprivation. In addition to Super Output Areas, summary measures of the ID2007 are presented at district level, county level and Primary Care Trust (PCT) level.

See also
 Scottish Index of Multiple Deprivation (SIMD) 
 Townsend Deprivation Index

References

Department for Levelling Up, Housing and Communities
Measurements and definitions of poverty
Medical data sets
Office for National Statistics
Poverty in England
Public health in the United Kingdom
Social statistics data